The MS City of York was a combination-passenger liner built in 1953 for Ellerman Lines' service between London and South Africa. Sold in 1971 to Karageorgis Lines, she was converted to a cruiseferry and renamed MS Mediterranean Sky.

History 

The City of York was built by Vickers Shipbuilding and Engineering of Barrow-in-Furness in the United Kingdom.

In 1971, she was sold, along with her three sister ships, to Karageorgis Lines. Along with City of Exeter, she was converted into a ferry and renamed Mediterranean Sky.

The Mediterranean Sky sailed for the last time in 1996. She started listing after being laid up in Eleusis Bay, Greece. The abandoned ship was then towed to shallow water where she was beached on 26 November 2002. She capsized and sank by January 2003 with the half-submerged wreck still visible in 2021. In 2017 graffiti crew OneUp painted “1UP” on the exposed side of the ship, covering about 1/2 of the total exposed area. The wreck is visible from Google Earth as of 2021.

Gallery

References

External links

 Mediterranean Sky wreck photo

1953 ships
Cruise ships
Cruise ships of Greece
Cruise ships of the United Kingdom
Maritime incidents in 2003
Ocean liners
Passenger ships of Greece
Shipwrecks of Greece